Marawah may refer to:

Marawah, Libya
Marawah, United Arab Emirates